Mile Rocks Lighthouse is located on a rock about  southwest of the Golden Gate Bridge, off of Lands End in San Francisco, California. It was completed in 1906, replacing a nearby bell buoy. In 1966, the light was automated, and the original  tower of the lighthouse was demolished and replaced by a helipad. The lighthouse was at one time painted with alternating red and white rings, but , the lighthouse is painted plain white.

History 
In 1889, the United States Lighthouse Service placed a bell buoy near the rocks. However, strong currents in the area would pull the buoy beneath the surface of the water and set it adrift.

On February 22, 1901, the SS City of Rio de Janeiro wrecked on the rocks, which prompted the lighthouse to be built. One hundred and twenty-eight persons, of 209 aboard, lost their lives when the ship sank.

The lighthouse was constructed by contractor James McMahon who hired sailors from San Francisco after his original crew refused to work in the dangerous conditions. Mile Rocks Lighthouse was finished in 1906 after considerable difficulty caused by the heavy seas and strong currents near the site.

The rock upon which the lighthouse is built measures only  at high water. The base of the tower is a large block of concrete protected by steel plating. Steel and concrete in the foundation weigh . The superstructure is made of steel and houses the fog signal apparatus and the quarters for the former keepers.

In 1966, the light was automated and the tower was removed, leaving only foundation and the first story. The top of the first story was modified to support a helipad for the US Coast Guard. The original third order Fresnel lens was transferred to the Old Point Loma Lighthouse in San Diego.

Gallery

See also 

 List of lighthouses in the United States

References

External links 
 
 

Lighthouses completed in 1906
Lighthouses in San Francisco
1906 establishments in California